Ilukwatta Grama Niladhari Division is a Grama Niladhari Division of the Yatinuwara Divisional Secretariat of Kandy District of Central Province, Sri Lanka. It has Grama Niladhari Division Code 173.

Govindala and Giragma are located within, nearby or associated with Ilukwatta.

Ilukwatta is a surrounded by the Alanduwaka, Arambegama West, Kiriwavula East, Kiriwavula West, Urapola and Pilimathalawa Grama Niladhari Divisions.

Demographics

Ethnicity 
The Ilukwatta Grama Niladhari Division has a Sinhalese majority (86.4%) and a significant Moor population (12.0%). In comparison, the Yatinuwara Divisional Secretariat (which contains the Ilukwatta Grama Niladhari Division) has a Sinhalese majority (89.9%)

Religion 
The Ilukwatta Grama Niladhari Division has a Buddhist majority (85.1%) and a significant Muslim population (12.6%). In comparison, the Yatinuwara Divisional Secretariat (which contains the Ilukwatta Grama Niladhari Division) has a Buddhist majority (88.8%)

References 

Grama Niladhari Divisions of Yatinuwara Divisional Secretariat
Geography of Kandy District